Traditional serrated adenoma is a premalignant type of polyp found in the colon, often in the distal colon (sigmoid, rectum). Traditional serrated adenomas are a type of serrated polyp, and may occur sporadically or as a part of serrated polyposis syndrome. Traditional serrated adenomas are relatively rare, accounting for less than 1% of all colon polyps. Usually, traditional serrated adenomas  are found in the distal colon and are usually less than 10 mm in size. 


Histopathology
Traditional serrated adenomas are characterized by ectopic crypts, pseudostratification, and a villous pattern with stretched nuclei.

Epidemiology
Usually found in individuals over the age of 50 years, traditional serrated adenomas affect men and women equally. The overall prevalence of traditional serrated adenomas is less than 1% of the general population. Traditional serrated adenomas are the least common type of serrated polyps found in the colon, accounting for 5% of serrated colon polyps.

References

Digestive system neoplasia
Histopathology